Hemant Pandey is an India film, theatre and television actor, most known for his role as Pandeyji in TV series, Office Office (2000). Originally from Pithoragarh, Uttarakhand,  Hemant Pandey got his first break in Delhi by an NGO called Janmadhyam and Allaripu which is specially for women. Hemant has worked in all fields of acting in theatre, television shows and movies also.

Career
Film Career

A few of his accomplishments are the movies Krrish, Milenge Milenge, etc.

TV Career

He got his first major role in 1996, with Taank Jhank. He played one of the tenants alongside Dharmesh Vyas and Hemant Kevani, who wants to be an IAS officer. After that he worked in Office Office (TV show) and Mrs. Malinee Iyer (TV show) with his best contributions. According to Hemant Pandey, he grew up watching comedies of the legendary Johny Walker and Johnny Lever, the comedians.

He worked as a character named "Ghasita" on Imagine TV's Neer Bhare Tere Naina Devi. In this, Ghasita is a common villager and like many in his village, he too is burdened by poverty. Being the sole bread-winner of the family, he does not think twice the moment he gets a chance to become rich even at the cost of his daughter Laxmi being exploited. He fools the villagers by projecting his daughter as a Devi and pockets the money he earns in the name of God. As the wealth starts pouring in, his stature in the village and his lifestyle changes. He starts believing that he is now the most powerful man of the village eventually becoming cunning, shrewd and greedy.

Also simultaneously working in as a stand up comedian in Sony's Kahani Comedy Circus Ki.

Filmography
 Monisha En Monalisa (1999) (Tamil)
 Mujhe Kucch Kehna Hai (2000)
 Rehnaa Hai Terre Dil Mein (2001)
 Aap Mujhe Achche Lagne Lage (2002)
 Ab Ke Baras (2002}
 Badhaai Ho Badhaai (2002)
 Fareb (2005)
 Krrish (2006)
 Detective Naani (2006)
 Sankat City (2006)
 Kaalo (2010)
 Ready (2011)
 Bin Bulaye Baraati (2011)
 Chala Mussaddi... Office Office (2011)
 Be Careful (2011)
 Machhli Jal Ki Rani Hai (2012)
 2 Nights in Soul Valley (2012)
 Yaariyan (2014)
 Chor Bazaari (2015)
 Dil Toh Deewana Hai (2016)
 Journey of Bhangover (2017)
 When Obama Loved Osama (2018)
 Mausam Ikrar Ke Do Pal Pyar Ke (2018)
 Dagaalty (2020) (Tamil)
 Chal Guru Ho Ja Shuru
Television
 Taak Jhaank (1996)
 Kya Baat Hai (1998)
 Hera Pheri (1999)
 Office Office (2000)
 Tamanna House (2004)
 Neer Bhare Tere Naina Devi (2010)
 Rashi Villa (2016)
 Shankar Jay Kishan  (2017)

References

External links
 

Indian male film actors
Living people
Indian male stage actors
Indian male television actors
Male actors in Hindi cinema
Indian stand-up comedians
People from Pithoragarh
Year of birth missing (living people)